Al Mouaallima Wal Oustaz is a popular Lebanese television series made during the 80s, Starring Ibrahim Maraachli, Hind Abi-Llama and Layla Karam. The series was broadcast on Télé Liban, the Lebanese national broadcaster and had a total of 13 episodes.

Synopsis
Al Mouaallima wal Oustaz takes place in a private school, named "Mahou L-Oummiya", where two professors teach grown-ups the basics of Arabic language. The first professor, a sympathetic man called Ibrahim (Ibrahim Meraachli), tries to marry the other teacher, played by Hind Abi-Llama, and finally succeeds. During this general Leitmotive, there are many comical events that happen, involving the two teachers, the principal and the students. The school's principal is Sitt Zarifeh (translates to Mrs. Sympathetic, although the character is the complete opposite), played by Layla Karam.

Crew

Cast

Main cast

Remaining Cast

Soundtrack

The music of the introduction is titled T'as fait du beau boulot, which translates from French to "You made a good Job". During the show, there are many mixing of the three languages, Arabic, English and French. This comes from the fact that Lebanese people are generally very fluent in the three, and usually use a combination of the three in their everyday discussions.

The song ending the series in the last episode is called Mitl El Ghouraba Mnetla'a (We meet as strangers). It was made and sung by Rabih El-Khouly.

Notes

The 13 episode series has been uploaded to YouTube by Shoof Drama Zaman titled "مسلسل المعلمة والأستاذ الحلقة 1 - إبراهيم مرعشلي - هند أبي اللمع". 

Lebanese television series
1980s Lebanese television series
Télé Liban original programming